Tegu is a common name of a number of species of lizards that belong to the families Teiidae and Gymnophthalmidae. Tegus are native to Central and South America. They occupy a variety of habitats and are known for their large size and predatory habits.

Description 
Tegus are usually mainly black and some have yellow, reddish or white bands along their backs. Others have lines going down their bodies and unique markings along their top. Their body shape is aerodynamic with long tails and strong legs. Most tegus grow to about a metre long, but the black and white tegu (S. merianae) can grow to about 1.3 metres.

Although they resemble monitor lizards, they are only distantly related to them; the similarities are a result of convergent evolution.

Tegus use their tongues and vomeronasal organ to find chemical cues associated with their prey and other lizards. A vomeronasal organ is an organ of chemoreception located in the nasal chamber.

Habitat 
Tegus naturally occur in rainforests, deciduous semiarid thorn forests, savannas, fields and grasslands. They have also adapted to open areas created by agriculture, parks and construction zones. They spend much of their time in burrows.

Diet 
As omnivores, tegus feed on various foods including fruits, insects, frogs, small rodents, birds, eggs and carrion. Tegus living near humans may raid chicken coops for eggs and baby chicks, or scavenge leftover food such as crackers, cheese and chips.

Behaviour 
When confronted, a wild tegu initially stops moving with its head held up high, then attempts to flee. It may turn aggressive if cornered, biting and attacking with its tail. In contrast, captive-raised tegus can be docile, intelligent and social with their carers.

In the coolest areas of their range, such as northern Argentina, tegus hibernate from June to September.

Endothermy 
During the reproductive season, Argentine black and white tegus can raise their body temperature by up to 10 °C above the ambient temperature (seasonal reproductive endothermy). This may be advantageous when coming out of hibernation, regrowing gonads, producing gametes (gametogenesis), mating and (for females) producing eggs and incubating them.

Importance 
Tegus are hunted for their meat, fat and skins.

Argentine black and white tegus are kept as pets.

Some species have become invasive species in the US states of Florida and southern Georgia.

Genera 
"Tegu" generally refers to species of lizard in the genus Tupinambis, which belongs to the family Teiidae. Not all lizards known as tegus belong to the same genus. The word "tegu" may refer to species in any of the following genera:

 Callopistes: "dwarf tegus" (2 species)
 Crocodilurus: the "crocodile tegu" (1 species)
 Dicrodon: "desert tegus" (3 species)
 Dracaena: "caiman tegus", also known as "caiman lizards" (2 species)
 Euspondylus: "sun tegus" (11 species)
 Proctoporus: "sun tegus" (17 species)
 Salvator (3 species, including the Argentine black and white tegu)
 Teius (3 species, including the "four-toed tegu")
 Tupinambis (8 species)

References 

Teiidae